Olavi Luoto (2 January 1927 – 15 February 2017) was a Finnish middle-distance runner. He competed in the men's 1500 metres at the 1948 Summer Olympics.

References

1927 births
2017 deaths
Athletes (track and field) at the 1948 Summer Olympics
Finnish male middle-distance runners
Olympic athletes of Finland
Place of birth missing